Personality is an American game show produced by Bob Stewart and hosted by Larry Blyden which ran on NBC from July 3, 1967, to September 26, 1969, at 11:00 AM, EST. The series was produced by Filmways. Bill Wendell, then on the NBC staff, announced the show.

Game play
A panel of three celebrities, each playing for a member of the studio audience or home viewer, tried to predict how other celebrities answered a series of questions asked in pre-recorded interviews.

Round 1
In the first round, two of the panelists were given three possible responses for each question asked to the third and after they chose, the correct answer was shown.

Round 2
In the second round, each celebrity panelist had to guess how a series of people responded to questions related to the celebrity.

Round 3
In the final round, each celebrity panelist had to guess how a different celebrity answered questions.

Each correct answer was worth $25 for the person they were playing for. The panelist with the most money at the end of the game won a vacation for his/her audience/home viewer partner.

Music
The show's original theme was "Struttin' with Maria" by Herb Alpert, while the second was composed by Bob Cobert. The second theme was later used for Stewart's Three on a Match.

Episode status
The series is believed to be wiped, as per network practices of the era, with only three episodes known to exist – #437 (March 4, 1969) and #542 (July 29, 1969). GSN has aired the latter several times, although it also circulates among private collectors as a studio master with production slate. Another episode from the same week as #542 has recently been discovered and uploaded to YouTube.

References

External links
 

1967 American television series debuts
1969 American television series endings
Television series by Bob Stewart Productions
Television series by Sony Pictures Television
NBC original programming
English-language television shows
1960s American game shows
American panel games
Lost television shows
Television series by Filmways